The Chlorogomphidae are a family of Odonata (dragonflies) from the suborder Anisoptera.

References

 
Cordulegastroidea
Odonata families
Taxa named by James George Needham